Jean-Claude Magnan (born 4 June 1941 in Aubagne, Bouches-du-Rhône) is a French fencer and Olympic champion in foil competition, and a medalist in three successive Olympics.

He received a gold medal in foil team at the 1968 Summer Olympics in Mexico City, together with Gilles Berolatti, Christian Noël, Daniel Revenu and Jacques Dimont. He participated and received medals at the 1964, 1968 and 1972 summer Olympics.

References

External links

1941 births
Living people
People from Aubagne
French male foil fencers
Olympic fencers of France
Fencers at the 1960 Summer Olympics
Fencers at the 1964 Summer Olympics
Fencers at the 1968 Summer Olympics
Fencers at the 1972 Summer Olympics
Olympic gold medalists for France
Olympic silver medalists for France
Olympic bronze medalists for France
Olympic medalists in fencing
Medalists at the 1964 Summer Olympics
Medalists at the 1968 Summer Olympics
Medalists at the 1972 Summer Olympics
Sportspeople from Bouches-du-Rhône
20th-century French people